2064 Thomsen is a stony asteroid and Mars-crosser on an eccentric orbit, that measures approximately  in diameter. The asteroid was discovered by Finnish astronomer Liisi Oterma at Turku Observatory, Finland, on 8 September 1942. It was named after New Zealand astronomer Ivan Leslie Thomsen

Orbit and classification 

The S-type asteroid orbits the Sun in the inner main-belt at a distance of 1.5–2.9 AU once every 3 years and 3 months (1,174 days). Its orbit has an eccentricity of 0.33 and an inclination of 6° with respect to the ecliptic.

Naming 

This minor planet was named in memory of New Zealand astronomer Ivan Leslie Thomsen (1910–1969), director of the Carter Observatory, Wellington, from 1945 until he was appointed director of the Mount John University Observatory only two months before his death. He was an enthusiastic coordinator of New Zealand's astronomy and his efforts eventually led to the minor-planet observing program with the Carter Observatory 41-cm reflector. It was the 1977 rediscovery at the Carter Observatory that allowed this minor planet to be numbered. The official  was published by the Minor Planet Center on 1 August 1978.

Physical characteristics 

Four rotational lightcurves gave a well-defined rotation period of 4.233 hours with a brightness variation of 0.62–0.69 magnitude and an albedo of 0.055 and 0.16, as measured by the IRAS and Akari surveys, respectively.

References

External links 
 Lightcurve Database Query (LCDB), at www.minorplanet.info
 Dictionary of Minor Planet Names, Google books
 Asteroids and comets rotation curves, CdR – Geneva Observatory, Raoul Behrend
 
 

002064
Discoveries by Liisi Oterma
Named minor planets
002064
19420908